The Pontifical Beda College is a college in Rome. It was founded as the Collegio Ecclesiastico at the Palazzo dei Convertendi in 1852 by Pope Pius IX and is intended for  older men, often convert clergymen, wishing to prepare for the Roman Catholic priesthood.

History
This college was  moved in 1854  to the  English College to accommodate a larger number of clergymen from England who had joined the Roman Catholic Church from other Christian denominations and wished to prepare for the Catholic priesthood. They came only for four years, because they were seen to have significant experience already. Here the college became known as the Collegio Pio. It also included lifelong Catholics, drawn to the priesthood later in life and priests studying for post-graduate degrees in Rome. Pope Leo XIII  issued a new constitution in 1898 and placed the college under the patronage of the Venerable Bede, the eighth century  Anglo-Saxon monk and scholar. Cardinal Howard bequeathed to the two colleges his valuable library.

It was decided by the Sacred Congregation of Studies (1917), that it should be completely separated from the Venerable English College, and that it should have a corporate life entirely of its own under a rector and staff of its own and in its own premises. Pending the acquisition of a permanent home, temporary premises were rented in the Prati di Castello from the Polish Hospice. Mgr Mann was brought from England to be the new rector, and the Rev. J. C. Richards was appointed vice-rector. The Bede students took up their new quarters on 2 January 1918.

When the First World War ended, the Polish returned to Rome and the Beda became homeless. The community was transferred in 1922 to the Via S. Niccolo da Tolentino close by the Piazza Barberini. The college made progress under the guidance of Mgr Mann and his Vice-Rector Mgr McShane.

In 1956 Pope Pius XII provided from the extraterritorial property of the Holy See the land on which the present Beda stands, adjacent to the Basilica of Saint Paul Outside the Walls. Pope John XXIII formally opened the new building on 20 October 1960.

The Beda remains the responsibility of the Bishops of England and Wales but now receives men from English-speaking countries worldwide.

List of rectors

1852-1864: Rev Dr English
1864-1867:  Rev Dr Neve
1867-1897:  Mgr O'Callaghan
1897-1908: Mgr Giles [Vice-Rector]
1908-1911: Mgr Butt [Vice-Rector]
1911-1917: Mgr George [Vice-Rector
1918-1928: Mgr Mann
 1928–1961: Mgr Charles Duchemin
1961-1972: Mgr Cutrin
1972-1978: Mgr Travers
1978-1987: Mgr Mitchell
 1987–1991: Mgr Walter Drumm
1991-1992: Mgr Walton
1992-1998: Mgr Brian Dazaley
 1998–2015: Mgr Roderick Strange
 2015–present: Canon Philip Gillespie

References

External links 
 Pontifical Beda College Official Website

Educational institutions established in 1852
English College, Rome
Catholic Church in England and Wales
Roman Colleges
1852 establishments in the Papal States